Ambrogio Frangiolli (Milan, 1798–1870) was an Italian decorator, architect and painter.

He studied in Rome and Turin. After winning an architecture contest in the Accademia Albertina, he moved to Rome in 1829, where he studied further in descriptive geometry. In 1833, he returned to Turin and became professor of the Accademia Albertina.

He created his own Scuola di Decorazione (English: School of Decoration) and designed the interiors of numerous famous residences in Rome, Turin, Vienna and Milan.

References
 Ferrario, Giulio (1837). Aggiunte all'opera Il costume antico e moderno di tutti i popoli, cogli analoghi disegni (Enlarged and updated from the earlier edition published in Milan (1831–1834) under the title Aggiunte e rettificazioni all'opera Il costume antico e moderno ed.). Firenze: V. Batelli. 
 E. Clive Rouse (1968). Discovering Wall Paintings. Guildhall: Shire Publications.

1798 births
1870 deaths
19th-century Italian architects
Architects from Turin
Italian decorators
19th-century Italian painters
Italian male painters
Painters from Milan
Accademia Albertina alumni
Academic staff of Accademia Albertina
19th-century Italian male artists